Eoperipatus butleri is a Malaysian species of velvet worm in the Peripatidae family.

Taxonomy
Eoperipatus butleri was described by Richard Evans in 1901, from a single female specimen discovered by A. M. Butler in the Larut Hills of West Malaysia. The generic name Eoperipatus is derived from an Ancient Greek combining form of ēṓs, meaning "dawn", and peripatos, meaning "walking about". The specific name butleri is in honour of its discoverer. Although some have suggested that E. butleri is a junior synonym of E. weldoni, other authorities maintain that E. butleri is valid as a different species, citing the significant distance (over 300 km) between the type localities of these two species.

Description
The dorsal surface is dark brown with pale spots and a darker brown mid-dorsal line extending from the first pair of oncopods (legs)  to the anus. The ventral surface is slightly lighter brown than the dorsal surface. The type specimen was 52 mm in length and 6 mm in width. The female of this species has 24 pairs of legs, but the male has only 22 leg pairs.

References

Onychophoran species
Onychophorans of southeast Asia
Animals described in 1901